"Umqombothi" ("African Beer") is a song performed by South African singer Yvonne Chaka Chaka. It was composed by Sello "Chicco" Twala and Attie van Wyk. Umqombothi, in Xhosa, is a beer commonly found in South Africa made from maize, maize malt, sorghum malt, yeast and water.

Hotel Rwanda featured "Umqombothi" in the beginning of the film.

References

1988 songs
Xhosa culture
World music songs
Songs about alcohol